Tell Goran, also known as Jilu, is a village near Tell Tamer in western al-Hasakah Governorate, northeastern Syria. Administratively it belongs to the Nahiya Tell Tamer.

The village is inhabited by Assyrians belonging to the Syriac Orthodox Church. At the 2004 census, it had a population of 183.

See also

Assyrians in Syria
List of Assyrian settlements
Al-Hasakah offensive (February–March 2015)

References

Assyrian communities in Syria